Charles Leon Robinson II (born December 20, 1989), known professionally as Chaz Robinson, is an American singer, songwriter, record producer, model, and Jump Roper from Indianapolis. He has worked with Emmy Award-Winning choreographers, Tabitha and Napoleon D’Umo. On the 2015 Grammy Ballot, he received 2 nods for Best Pop Solo Performance.

Discography

Songs
 Upside (2012)
 Love Will Come Back Again (2014)
 Trance (2014)
 Barrier of Sound (2016) 
 Without You (2016)

Albums
 Chaz (2016)
 Rising Stars, Vol. 1 (2018)
 Love Is Love (2018)

TV Appearances
 Disney's Shake It Up
 Broadway's Cirque Dreams Jungle Fantasy
 MTV's America's Best Dance Crew: Season 5
 MTV's Made
 The Ellen DeGeneres Show
 Le plus grand cabaret du monde
 Friday Zone

References

External links
 
 

Living people
1989 births
21st-century American singers
American performance artists
American jazz singers
American tenors
American male pop singers
American male singer-songwriters
Musicians from Indianapolis
21st-century American male singers
American male jazz musicians
Singer-songwriters from Indiana